In mathematics, the principal part has several independent meanings, but usually refers to the negative-power portion of the Laurent series of a function.

Laurent series definition
 
is the portion of the Laurent series consisting of terms with negative degree. That is,
 
If the inner radius of convergence is not 0, then  may be regular at  despite the Laurent series having an infinite principal part.

Other definitions

Calculus
Consider the difference between the function differential and the actual increment:

The differential dy is sometimes called the principal (linear) part of the function increment Δy.

Distribution theory
The term principal part is also used for certain kinds of distributions having a singular support at a single point.

See also
Mittag-Leffler's theorem
Cauchy principal value

References

External links
Cauchy Principal Part at PlanetMath

Complex analysis
Generalized functions